Kyle Harris Higashioka (born April 20, 1990) is an American professional baseball catcher for the New York Yankees of Major League Baseball (MLB). He was drafted in the seventh round of the 2008 MLB draft, and made his MLB debut in 2017.

Career
Higashioka attended Edison High School in Huntington Beach, California. He played for the school's baseball team and committed to the University of California, Berkeley to play college baseball for the California Golden Bears.

New York Yankees
The New York Yankees selected him in the seventh round of the 2008 MLB draft. He signed with the Yankees, receiving a $500,000 signing bonus, rather than attending college.

Higashioka played in 2012 for the Tampa Yankees of the Class A-Advanced Florida State League and Trenton Thunder, batting .170/.228/.327 in 147 at bats combined. During the 2013 and 2014 seasons he played in only 13 games combined, due to Tommy John surgery and a broken thumb. He played with the Tampa Yankees in 2015, and became a minor league free agent after the 2015 season. He re-signed with the Yankees during the offseason.

Higashioka started the 2016 season with the Trenton Thunder of the Class AA Eastern League, and won the Player of the Week Award. He was promoted to the Scranton/Wilkes-Barre RailRiders of the Class AAA International League during the season. He finished the 2016 season with a .276 batting average, 21 home runs, and 81 runs batted in, and the Yankees added him to their 40 man roster.

The Yankees optioned Higashioka to Scranton/Wilkes-Barre for the start of the 2017 season. After playing in one game, Higashioka was promoted to the major leagues, following an injury to Gary Sánchez. Higashioka made his major league debut as a defensive replacement on April 10. He batted 0-for-18 in nine games for the Yankees, and was optioned back to Scranton/Wilkes-Barre on May 5, when Sánchez was activated from the disabled list. The Yankees promoted Higashioka back to the major leagues on June 16. After returning to the minors he suffered a knee injury and played in eight minor league games during August and September.

Higashioka began the 2018 season with Scranton/Wilkes-Barre. With Scranton/Wilkes-Barre in 2018, he batted .202/.276/.346 in 188 at bats. He was called up to the majors on June 27, following an injury to Sánchez.

After starting his major league career 0-for-22, the longest hitless streak to start a Yankee career of any position player ever, he had his first major league hit, a home run, on July 1 against David Price of the Boston Red Sox. His next two hits, on July 3 and July 4 against the Atlanta Braves, were also home runs, making him the ninth MLB player since 1920 to have three home runs as his first three hits. With the Yankees in 2018, he batted .167/.241/.319 in 72 at bats.

In 2019, Higashioka batted .214 with three home runs and 11 RBIs in 18 games with the Yankees.

On September 16, 2020, Higashioka hit three home runs in a game against the Toronto Blue Jays. He became the 24th Yankee to have a three home run game and the first to do so while batting ninth in the batting order. 

On May 19, 2021, Higashioka caught Corey Kluber's no-hitter against the Texas Rangers. In doing so, he became the first Yankees catcher to catch a no-hitter since Joe Girardi caught David Cone's perfect game in 1999. 

On June 12, 2022, Higashioka made MLB history during an 18–4 victory over the Chicago Cubs when he homered a 35.1 MPH pitch off of first baseman Frank Schwindel who came in to pitch in the eighth inning. It was the slowest pitch hit for a home run in the Statcast era since 2015.

Personal life
Kyle Higashioka is married to Alyse Higashioka. His father, Ted, is a third-generation Japanese American. Kyle learned Japanese to connect with his heritage and better communicate with former teammate Masahiro Tanaka. Higashioka also studied Spanish in high school and uses it to communicate with Latin American teammates. Higashioka promised his mother, Diane, that he would earn a college degree and is taking classes in mechanical engineering at Orange Coast College.

References

External links

1990 births
American baseball players of Japanese descent
Baseball players from California
Charleston RiverDogs players
Gulf Coast Yankees players
Living people
Major League Baseball catchers
New York Yankees players
Scottsdale Scorpions players
Scranton/Wilkes-Barre RailRiders players
Sportspeople from Huntington Beach, California
Staten Island Yankees players
Tampa Yankees players
Trenton Thunder players
Pulaski Yankees players
2023 World Baseball Classic players